Jamides elioti is a butterfly of the lycaenids or blues family. It is found in Sulawesi.

References

Jamides
Butterflies described in 1994